Wonderland Homes is an unincorporated, developed "neighborhood" community in Meade County, South Dakota, United States, consisting of numerous homes in subdivisional layout and several small businesses. Its origins are unknown, as is its relationship to other places or real estate development businesses called "Wonderland Homes". It is in the southwest part of Meade county, on the eastern edge of the Black Hills. It is bordered to the southwest by the town of Summerset and to the north by the town of Piedmont, to which towns it is sometimes connected as might be a subdivision.

The United States Census Bureau utilizes the neighborhood called Wonderland Homes as a census-designated place (CDP) for statistics-keeping purposes, not assigning it to any adjacent organized community. It was first listed as a CDP prior to the 2020 census. The population of the CDP was 718 at the 2020 census.

CDP-limited Demographics

References 

Census-designated places in Meade County, South Dakota
Census-designated places in South Dakota